Events from the year 1462 in France

Incumbents
 Monarch – Louis XI

Events

Births

27 June – Louis XII of France (died 1515)

Deaths

Full date missing
Jeanne de Bar, Countess of Marle and Soissons (born 1415)
Bernard d'Armagnac, Count of Pardiac
Catherine of Alençon, duchess (born before 1396)
Nicolas Rolin, chancellor (born 1376)

See also

References

1460s in France